Is God Is is an American play by Aleshea Harris. In 2018 a production directed by Taibi Magar opened Off-Broadway at Soho Rep and ran from February 6 to March 11. The play looks at deviant morality, familial dysfunction, being a black girl/woman, and patricide.

Plot 
Twenty-one year old African-American twin sisters Racine and Anaia were burned and scarred as babies. Racine has burn scars on her arms, back and neck, and Anaia has scars on her arms, face and neck. After receiving a letter in their apartment in Northeast, they journey to the Dirty South to the deathbed of their mother, who is known as "SHE" or "God" and has scars all over her body. SHE informs them that their father, referred to as “Man”, set the fire that burned the three of them. SHE instructs the sisters to go west to The Valley to find and kill him. The sisters travel there to face Man and his new family.

Reception 
Is God Is received 3 Obie Awards: for Playwriting for Aleshea Harris, Directing for Taibi Magar, and Performance for Alfie Fuller as Anaia and Dame-Jasmine Hughes as Racine.

The play won the American Playwriting Foundation's Relentless Award in 2016. The award, issued to playwrights annually to honor Philip Seymour Hoffman, honored the play, noting its depiction of a revenge story that draws from "the ancient, the modern, the tragic, the Spaghetti Western, hip-hop and Afropunk". The cash prize of $45,000 is the largest cash prize in American theatre given, and about 2,000 un-produced plays were submitted. The award gave Harris the opportunity to have stage readings in regional theaters across the country and abroad.

References 

2018 plays
Off-Broadway plays
Obie Award-winning plays